Imtiaz Harper (born 4 April 1962) is a Guyanese cricketer. He played in eight first-class and five List A matches for Guyana from 1986 to 1991.

See also
 List of Guyanese representative cricketers

References

External links
 

1962 births
Living people
Guyanese cricketers
Guyana cricketers
Sportspeople from Georgetown, Guyana